Ivan Scap (born December 3, 1955) is a former Yugoslav ice hockey player. He played for the Yugoslavia men's national ice hockey team at the 1976 Winter Olympics in Innsbruck and the 1984 Winter Olympics in Sarajevo.

References

External links

1955 births
Living people
HK Acroni Jesenice players
Ice hockey players at the 1976 Winter Olympics
Ice hockey players at the 1984 Winter Olympics
Olympic ice hockey players of Yugoslavia
Sportspeople from Jesenice, Jesenice
Slovenian ice hockey defencemen
Yugoslav ice hockey defencemen